David Hayman (born 1948) is a Scottish film, television and stage actor and director.

David Hayman may also refer to:
 David Hayman (disease ecologist), New Zealand-based epizootic epidemiologist and disease ecologist

See also
 David Heyman (disambiguation)
 David Heymann (disambiguation)